This is a list of historic companies in Omaha. These businesses were either located in Omaha, founded in Omaha and/or still functioning in Omaha.

See also
 History of Omaha
 Historic hospitals in Omaha

References

Companies
 
Historic companies